Established in 1863, Hampshire County Cricket Club has played first-class cricket from 1864 to 1885 and from 1895 to present.  It has taken part in every edition County Championship since 1895.  This is a list of Hampshire first-class cricket records; that is, record team and individual performances in first-class cricket for Hampshire County Cricket Club.

Team
 Highest Total For: 714/5d v Nottinghamshire at the Rose Bowl, Southampton, 2005
 Highest Total Against: 742 by Surrey at The Oval, 1909
 Lowest Total For: 15 v Warwickshire at Edgbaston, Birmingham, 1922
 Lowest Total Against: 23 by Yorkshire at Acklam Park, Middlesbrough, 1965

Batting
 Highest Score: 316 Dick Moore v Warwickshire, Dean Park, Bournemouth 1937
 Most Runs in Season: 2,854 Phil Mead, 1928

Most first-class runs for Hampshire
Qualification - 19,000 runs

Highest Partnership for each wicket
Correct as of 2 October 2022.

Bowling
 Best Bowling: 9/25 Bob Cottam v Lancashire at Old Trafford, Manchester, 1965
 Best Match Bowling: 17/86 Kyle Abbott v Somerset at Ageas Bowl, Southampton, 2019
 Wickets in Season: 190, Alec Kennedy, 1922

Most first-class wickets for Hampshire
Qualification - 1000 wickets

Wicket-keeping
 Most catches in a season: 76 Leo Harrison, 1959
 Most stumpings in a season: 32 Walter Livsey, 1921

Most victims for Hampshire
Qualification - 350 victims

References

See also
 List of Hampshire CCC List A cricket records
 List of Hampshire CCC Twenty20 cricket records

Hampshire
Hampshire County Cricket Club